Unionism is a political tradition on the island of Ireland that favours political union with Great Britain and professes loyalty to the British Crown and constitution. As the overwhelming sentiment of Ireland's Protestant minority, following Catholic Emancipation (1829) unionism mobilised to keep Ireland part of the United Kingdom and to defeat the efforts of Irish nationalists to restore a separate Irish parliament. Since Partition (1921), as Ulster Unionism  its goal has been to maintain Northern Ireland as part of the United Kingdom and to resist a transfer of sovereignty to an all-Ireland republic. Within the framework of a 1998 peace settlement, unionists in Northern Ireland have had to accommodate Irish nationalists in a devolved government, while continuing to rely on the link with Britain to secure their cultural and economic interests.

Unionism became an overarching partisan affiliation in Ireland in response to what were seen as Liberal government concessions to Irish nationalists. Typically Presbyterian agrarian-reform Liberals coalesced with traditionally Anglican Orange Order Conservatives in opposition to the Irish Home Rule Bills of 1886 and 1893. Joined by loyalist labour, on the eve of World War I this broad opposition to Irish self-government concentrated in Belfast and its hinterlands as Ulster Unionism, and prepared an armed resistance—the Ulster Volunteers.

Within the partition settlement of 1921 by which the rest of Ireland attained separate statehood, Ulster Unionists accepted a home-rule dispensation for the six north-east counties remaining in the United Kingdom. For the next 50 years the Ulster Unionist Party exercised the devolved powers of the Northern Ireland Parliament with little domestic opposition and outside of the governing party-political system of the United Kingdom.

In 1972, the British government suspended this arrangement. Against a background of growing political violence, and citing the need to consider how Catholics in Northern Ireland could be integrated into its civic and political life, it prorogued the parliament in Belfast.

Over the ensuing three decades of The Troubles, Unionists divided in their responses to power-sharing proposals presented, in consultation with the Republic of Ireland, by successive British governments. Following the 1998 Belfast Agreement, under which both republican and loyalist paramilitaries committed to permanent ceasefires, unionists accepted principles of joint office and parallel consent in a new Northern Ireland legislature and executive.

Renegotiated in 2006, relations within this consociational arrangement remain fraught. Unionists, with diminished electoral strength, charge their nationalist partners in government with pursuing an anti-British cultural agenda and, post-Brexit, with supporting a customs regime (the Northern Ireland Protocol) incompatible with both the Act of Union and the Belfast Agreement.

Irish Unionism 1800–1904

The Act of Union 1800

In the last decades of the Kingdom of Ireland (1542–1800), Protestants in public life advanced themselves as Irish Patriots.The focus of their patriotism was the Parliament in Dublin. Confined on a narrow franchise to landed members of the established Anglican communion (the Protestant Ascendancy), the parliament denied equal protection and public office to Dissenters (non-Anglican Protestants) and to the Kingdom's dispossessed Roman Catholic majority. The high point of this parliamentary patriotism was the formation during the American War of Independence, of the Irish Volunteers and, as that militia paraded in Dublin, the securing in 1782 of the parliament's legislative independence from the British government in London.

In Ulster where, because of their greater numbers, Protestants were less fearful of sharing political rights with Catholics, combinations of Presbyterian tradesmen, merchants, and tenant farmers protested against an unrepresentative parliament and against an executive in Dublin Castle still appointed, through the office of the Lord Lieutenant, by English ministers. Seeing little prospect of further reform and in the hope that they might be assisted by republican France, these United Irishmen sought a revolutionary union of "Catholic, Protestant and Dissenter" (i.e. of Catholics and Protestants of all persuasions). Their resolve was broken with the defeat of their uprising in 1798, and by reports of rebel outrages against Protestant Loyalists in the South.

The British government, which had had to deploy its own forces to suppress the rebellion in Ireland and to turn back and defeat French intervention, decided on a union with Great Britain. For the chief of the Castle executive Lord Castlereagh, the principal merit in merging the two kingdoms was a resolution of the Catholic Question. Linked to England, Protestants would have less reason to fear Catholic advancement, while Catholics, reduced to a minority within the United Kingdom, would moderate their demands. However, due to opposition in England, and from the King, George III, a provision for Catholic emancipation was dropped from the Acts of Union. A separate Irish executive in Dublin was retained, but representation, still wholly Protestant, was transferred to Westminster constituted as the Parliament of the United Kingdom of Great Britain and Ireland.

In decades that followed the Act of Union (1800) supporters of the United Irish cause and their descendants were reconciled to the loss of an Irish parliament. Having refused calls for reform—to broaden representation and curb corruption—most saw little cause to regret its passing. In time, and as Protestants, they came to regard the legislative union with Great Britain as a source of their relative prosperity and, as the Roman Catholic majority in Ireland began to gather in a new national movement, as a guarantee of their security.

Catholic emancipation and "Protestant unity"

It took the Union thirty years to deliver on the promise of Catholic emancipation (1829)—to admit Catholics to Parliament—and permit an erosion of the Protestant monopoly on position and influence. An opportunity to integrate Catholics through their re-emerging propertied and professional classes as a minority within the United Kingdom may have passed. In 1830, the leader of the Catholic Association, Daniel O’Connell, invited Protestants to join in a campaign to repeal the Union and restore the Kingdom of Ireland under the Constitution of 1782.

In the North, resistance to the call was stiffened by a religious revival. With its emphasis upon "personal witness", the New Reformation appeared to transcend the ecclesiastical differences between the different Protestant denominations At the same time, it launched them into "a far more conscious sense of separateness from the Church of Rome", then undergoing its own devotional revolution. The leading Presbyterian evangelist, Henry Cooke took the occasion to preach Protestant Unity. In 1834, at a mass demonstration hosted upon his estate by the 3rd Marquess of Downshire, Cooke proposed a "Christian marriage" between the two main Protestant denominations (Anglican and Presbyterian). Setting their remaining differences aside, they would cooperate on all "matters of common safety".

Presbyterian voters tended to favour reform-minded Whigs or, as they later emerged, tenant-right and free-trade Liberals, over the Conservative and Orange-Order candidates of the landed Ascendancy. But as the Irish party-political successors to O'Connell's Repeal movement gained representation and influence in Westminster, Cooke's call for unity was to be heeded in the progressive emergence of a pan-Protestant unionism.

The Irish party challenge at Westminster and the Land War

Up to, and through, the Great Famine of the 1840s, successive governments, Whig and Tory, had refused political responsibility for agrarian conditions in Ireland. The issues of a low-level tenant-landlord war came to Westminster in 1852 when the all-Ireland Tenant Right League helped return 48 MPs to Westminster where they sat as the Independent Irish Party. What the Young Irelander Gavan Duffy called the League of North and South soon fell apart. In the South the Church approved the Catholic MPs breaking their pledge of independent opposition and accepting government positions. In the North, the Protestant tenant righters, William Sharman Crawford and James MacKnight had their election meetings broken up by Orangemen.

For unionism the more momentous challenge lay in the wake of the 1867 Reform Act. In England and Wales it produced an electorate that no longer identified instinctively with the conservative interest in Ireland and was more open to the "home-rule" compromise that nationalists now presented. Ireland would remain within the United Kingdom but with a parliament in Dublin exercising powers devolved from Westminster. Meanwhile, in Ireland, a combination the secret ballot and increased representation for the towns, reduced the electoral influence of land owners and their agents, and contributed to the triumph, in 1874, of the Home Rule League. Fifty-nine members were returned to Westminster where they sat as the Irish Parliamentary Party (IPP).

In his first ministry (1868-1874), the Liberal premier William Ewart Gladstone had attempted conciliation. In 1869, he disestablished the Church of Ireland, and in 1870 introduced the Landlord and Tenant (Ireland) Act. In both measures conservative jurists identified threats to the integrity of the union. The establishment of the Anglican communion had been explicitly guaranteed by the Act of Union (the Ulster Protestant Defence Association claimed breach of contract); and provisions for tenant compensation and purchase, weak as they were, created a separate agrarian regime for Ireland at odds with the prevailing English conception of property rights.

In the Long Depression of the 1870s the Land War intensified. From 1879 it was organised by the direct-action Irish National Land League, led by the southern Protestant Charles Stewart Parnell.  As late as 1881 Gladstone resorted (over a 41-hour filibuster by IPP) to a Coercion Act allowing for arbitrary arrest and detention in protection of person and property. That year, in a further Land Act, he conceded the three F's—fair rent, free sale, and fixity of tenure. Recognising that "the land grievance had been a bond of discontent between Ulster and the rest of Ireland and in that sense a danger to the union", Irish Conservatives did not oppose the measure. Protestants in the eastern counties had admitted to the leadership of the tenant-right movement men, like the Rev. James Armour of Ballymoney, who were at best agnostic on the union, while in the west of the province (in Armagh, Cavan, Fermanagh and Tyrone) even Orangemen had started joining the Land League.

The final and decisive shift in favour of constitutional concessions came in the wake of the Third Reform Act of 1884. The near-universal admission to the suffrage of male heads of household tripled the electorate in Ireland. The 1885 election returned an IPP, now under the leadership of Parnell, of 85 Members (including 17 from Ulster where Conservatives and Liberals split the unionist vote). Gladstone, whose Liberals lost all 15 of their Irish seats, was able to form his second ministry only with their Commons support.

Reaction to Gladstone's Home Rule Bills

In June 1886, Gladstone tabled a The Government of Ireland Bill that was largely of his own drafting. Unionists were not persuaded by his inclusion of measures to limit the remit of a Dublin legislature and to reduce the weight of the popular vote (the 200 or so popularly elected members were to sit in session with 28 Irish Peers and a further 75 Members elected on a highly restrictive property franchise). Regardless of how it was constituted, they believed that an Irish legislature would enter into conflicts with the "imperial parliament" in London that could only be resolved through "complete separation".

In their opposition there was a clear economic interest. The upper and middle classes found in Britain and the Empire "a wide range of profitable careers--in the army, in the public services, in commerce--from which they might be shut out if the link between Ireland and Great Britain were weakened or severed". That same link was critical for all those employed in the great export industries of the North—textiles, engineering, shipbuilding. For these the Irish hinterland was less important than the industrial triangle that linked Belfast and region with Clydeside and the north of England. Yet the most popular summary of case against Irish self-government remained the message broadcast in a "great revival" of the Orange Order — "Home Rule means Rome Rule".

In the north, the competition represented by the growing numbers of Catholics arriving at mill and factory gates had already given the once largely rural (and Anglican) Orange Order a new lease among Protestant workers. The pattern, in itself, was not unique to Belfast and its satellites. Glasgow, Manchester, Liverpool and other British centres experiencing large-scale Irish immigration developed similar Orange and nativist ward and workplace politics with which unionists—organised in the Loyalist Anti-Repeal Union—sought to connect. With Gladstone's conversion to home rule, politicians who had held aloof from the Order now embraced its militancy. Colonel Edward Saunderson, who had represented Cavan as a Liberal, donned an Orange sash "because", he said "the Orange society is alone capable of dealing with the condition of anarchy and rebellion which prevail in Ireland".

In February 1886, playing, in his own words, the "Orange card", Lord Randolph Churchill assured a "monster meeting" of the Anti-Repeal Union in Belfast, that English Conservatives would "cast in their lot" with loyalists in resisting Home Rule, and he later coined the phrase that was to become the watchword of northern unionism: "Ulster will fight, and Ulster will be right".

Gladstone's own party was split on Home Rule and the House divided against the measure. In 1891 Ulster's Liberal Unionists, part of a larger Liberal break with Gladstone, entered Saunderson's Irish Unionist Alliance, and at Westminster took the Conservative whip.

In 1892, despite bitter division over the personally compromised leadership of Parnell, the Nationalists were able to help Gladstone to a third ministry. The result was a second Home Rule bill. It was greeted by an Ulster opposition more highly developed and better organised. A great Ulster Unionist Convention was held in Belfast organised by the Liberal Unionist Thomas Sinclair, whom the press noted had been an outspoken critic of Orangeism. Speakers and observers dwelt on the diversity of creed, class and party represented among the 12,300 delegates attending. As reported by the Northern Whig there were "the old tenant-righters of the 'sixties' . . . the sturdy reformers of Antrim. . . the Unitarians of Down, always progressive in their politics . . . the old-fashioned Tories of the Counties . . . modern Conservatives . . .  Orangemen . . . All these various elements--Whig, Liberal, Radical, Presbyterian, Episcopalian, Unitarian and Methodist . . united as one man."

While references to Catholics were conciliatory the Convention resolved: to retain unchanged our present position as an integral portion of the United Kingdom, and protest in the most unequivocal manner against the passage of any measure that would rob us of our inheritance in the Imperial Parliament, under the protection of which our capital has been invested and our home and rights safeguarded; that we record our determination to have nothing to do with a Parliament certain to be controlled by men responsible for the crime and outrage of the Land League . . . many of whom have shown themselves the ready instrument of clerical domination. 

After mammoth parliamentary sessions the bill, which did allow for Irish MPs, was passed by a narrow majority in the Commons but went down to defeat in the overwhelmingly Conservative House of Lords. The Conservatives formed a new ministry.

Constructive Unionism

The new Prime Minister Lord Salisbury believed his government should "leave Home Rule sleeping the sleep of the unjust". In 1887 Dublin Castle was given standing power to suspend habeas corpus. However, as Chief Secretary for Ireland, Salisbury's nephew Gerald Balfour (with the active support of Horace Plunkett, Unionist MP for South Dublin) determined upon a constructive course, pursuing reforms intended, as some saw it, to kill home rule with "kindness".

For the express purpose of relieving poverty and reducing emigration, in the Congested Districts of the west Balfour initiated a programme not only of public works, but of subsidy for local craft industries. A new Department of Agriculture and Technical Instruction broke with the traditions of Irish Boards by announcing that its aim was to "be in touch with public opinion of the classes whom its work concerns, and to rely largely for its success upon their active assistance and co-operation". It supported and encouraged dairy cooperatives, the Creameries, that were to be an important institution in the emergence of a new class of independent smallholders.

Greater reform followed when, with the support of the splinter Liberal Unionist Party, Salisbury returned to office in 1895. The Land Act of 1896 introduced for the first time the principle of compulsory sale to tenants, through its application was limited to bankrupt estates. "You would suppose", said Sir Edward Carson, Dublin barrister and the leading spokesman for Irish Conservatives, "that the Government were revolutionists verging on Socialism". Having been first obliged to surrender their hold on local government (transferred at a stroke in 1898 to democratically elected councils), the old landlord class had the terms of their retirement fixed by the Wyndham Land Act of 1903.

This reduced, but did not in itself resolve, agrarian tensions, even in the north. In 1906, Thomas Russell, MP, the son of an evicted Scottish crofter, broke with the Conservatives in the Irish Unionist Alliance to be returned to Westminster from South Tyrone as the champion of the Ulster Farmers and Labourers Union. With the Cork City MP, William O'Brien, Russell helped extend the period of constructivism by initiating the programme that built some 40,000 one-acre  labourer-owned cottages.

During the period of constructive unionism, and before a Liberal government revived the prospects for home rule, unionists appeared more at ease with interest in Irish culture. The first Ulster branch of the Gaelic League was formed in 1895 in east Belfast under the patronage of the Rev. John Baptiste Crozier and Dr. John St Clair Boyd, both avowed unionists, and of the Orange Order Grand Master, the Rev. Richard Tutledge Kane.

Catholic unionists 

The road to Catholicism's identification with constitutional Irish nationalism was "far from smooth and immediate", and a Catholic tradition of support for the union, focussed on the value of stability and of empire, survived the first home-rule crises. But it did not share the majority unionist conviction that any measure of devolution within the United Kingdom must lead to separation. Nor did it supply unionism with the equivalent of the Protestants who, individually, played a prominent role in home-rule and separatist politics. 

A handful of Irish Conservatives, drawn from the Catholic gentry, were returned to the Commons before the 1884 Reform Act. A “unique place” was occupied by Sir Denis Henry (1864-1925). When he won his native South Londonderry seat in a 1916 by-election, he was the first Catholic to represent a Unionist constituency in Ulster, and when he retained the seat in 1918, the future Lord Chief Justice of Northern Ireland was the last.

"The Ulster Option" 1905–1920

Unionist labour

In 1905, the Ulster Unionist Council was established to bring together unionists in the north including, with 50 of 200 seats, the Orange Order. Until then, unionism had largely placed itself behind Anglo-Irish aristocrats valued for their high-level connections in Great Britain. The UUC still accorded them a degree of precedence. Castlereagh's descendant and former Lord Lieutenant of Ireland, The 6th Marquess of Londonderry, presided over its executive. The Council also retained the services of Carson, from 1892 MP for Trinity College Dublin and supported him from 1910 as leader of the Irish Unionist parliamentary party. But marshalled by Captain James Craig, a millionaire director of Belfast's Dunville Whiskey, it was northern employers who undertook the real political and organisational work.

Unlike the southern landowners who were politically opposed by their Catholic tenants, the manufacturers and merchants of Belfast and neighbouring industrial districts could generally count on voting with the majority of their own workforce. But the loyalty of the Protestant worker was not unconditional. In the mind of many working-class unionists there was no contradiction between the defence of Protestant principle and political radicalism, "indeed, these were often seen as one and the same because it was the wealthy who were most prone to conciliation and treachery".

Exercising the new workingman's vote, in 1868 loyalists in Belfast had chosen their own "Conservative", rejecting a millowner and returning an evangelical Orangeman, William Johnston, to Westminster where he proceeded to propose and vote for labour protection, tenant right, the secret ballot and woman's suffrage In 1902, Johnston's successor as MP for South Belfast, Thomas Sloan, again was not the choice of employers. The campaign of the Belfast Protestant Association candidate was marked by what his opponents considered a classic piece of bigotry. Sloan protested the exemption of Catholic convents from inspection by the Hygiene Commission (the Catholic Church should not be "a state within a state"). But it was as a trade unionist that he criticised the "fur-coat brigade" in the leadership of unionism. Together with R. Lindsay Crawford and their Independent Orange Order, Sloan supported dock and linen-mill workers, led by the syndicalist James Larkin, in the great Belfast Lockout of 1907.

In July 1912, loyalists forced some 3,000 workers out of the shipyards and engineering plants in Belfast. Unlike previous incidents, the expellees included some 600 Protestants, targeted mainly because they were seen to support labour organising across sectarian lines. The Unionist press depicted any connection with either British Labour (who had held their first party conference in Belfast in 1907) or with the Irish Trades Union Congress as tantamount to support for Home Rule. Yet loyalist workers resented the idea that they were the retainers of "big-house unionists".  A manifesto signed in the spring of 1914 by two thousand labour men, rejected the suggestion of the radical and socialist press that Ulster was being manipulated by "an aristocratic plot". If Sir Edward Carson led in the battle for the Union it was "because we, the workers, the people, the democracy of Ulster, have chosen him".  The majority of the signatories would have been organised in British-based unions, and could point to the growing political weight of British labour in reform measures such as the Trade Disputes Act 1906, the People's Budget 1910, and the National Insurance Act 1911. Nationalists did not seek to persuade them that collective bargaining, progressive taxation and social security were principles for which majorities could be as readily found in an Irish parliament.

Unionism and women's suffrage

At what was to be the high point of mobilisation in Ulster against Home Rule, the Covenant Campaign of September 1912, the Unionist leadership decided that men alone could not speak for the determination of the Unionist people to defend "their equal citizenship in the United Kingdom". Women were asked to sign, not the Covenant whose commitment to "all means which may be found necessary" implied a readiness to bear arms, but their own Associate Declaration. A total of 234,046 women signed the Ulster Women's Declaration; 237,368 men signed the Solemn League and Covenant.

Unionist women had been involved in political campaigning from the time of the first Home Rule Bill in 1886. Some were active suffragettes. Isabella Tod, an anti-Home Rule Liberal and campaigner for girls education, was an early pioneer. Determined lobbying by her North of Ireland Women's Suffrage Society ensured the 1887 Act creating a new city-status municipal franchise for Belfast (piloted through the Commons by William Johnston) conferred the vote on persons rather than men. This was eleven years before women elsewhere Ireland gained the vote in local government elections.

The WSS had not been impressed by the women's Ulster Declaration or by the Ulster Women's Unionist Council (UWUC)—with over 100,000 members the largest women's political organisation in Ireland. Elizabeth McCracken noted the failure Unionist women to formulate "any demand on their own behalf or that of their own sex". Yet in September 1913 McCracken was celebrating a "marriage of unionism and women's suffrage". Following reports that the militant Women's Social and Political Union (WPSU) would begin organising in Ulster, the secretary of Ulster Unionist Council had informed the UWUC that draft articles for an Ulster Provisional Government included votes for women. The nationalists would make no such undertaking with regard to a Dublin parliament.

The marriage was short lived. In March 1914, Carson, after being door-stepped for fours days by the WSPU, ruled women's suffrage too divisive an issue for Unionists.There followed a series of arson-attacks on Unionist-owned and associated property that culminated in the bombing of Lisburn Cathedral, and in a trial in which the defendants, Dorothy Evans and  Lillian Metge, created an uproar by demanding to know why James Craig, then arming Ulster Volunteers with German rifles, was not appearing on the same charges.

In August 1914, suffragists in Ulster suspended their agitation for the duration of the European war. Their reward was a women's franchise in 1918 and (six years after it was granted in the Irish Free State) equal voting rights in 1928.

1912 Home Rule Crisis

In 1911 a Liberal administration was once again dependent on Irish nationalist MPs. In 1912 the Prime Minister, H. H. Asquith, introduced the Third Home Rule Bill. A more generous dispensation than the earlier bills, it would, for the first time, have given an Irish parliament an accountable executive. It was carried in the Commons by a majority of ten. As expected, it was defeated in the Lords, but as result of the crisis engendered by the opposition of the peers to the 1910 People's Budget the Lords now only had the power of delay. Home Rule would become law in 1914.

There had long been discussion of giving "an option to Ulster". As early as 1843, The Northern Whig reasoned that if differences in ethncity ("race") and interests argue for Ireland's separation from Great Britain, they could as easily argue for a separation of north and south, with Belfast as the capital of its own "distinct kingdom".  In response to the First Home rule Bill in 1886, Radical Unionists (Liberals who proposed federalising the relationship between all countries of the United Kingdom) likewise argued that "the Protestant part of Ulster should receive special treatment . . . on grounds identical with those that support the general contention for Home Rule" Northern unionists expressed no interest in a Belfast parliament, but in summarising The Case Against Home Rule (1912),  L. S. Amery insisted that "if Irish Nationalism constitutes a nation, then Ulster is a nation too".

Faced with the eventual enactment of Home Rule, Carson appeared to press this argument. On 28 September 1912, Ulster Day, he was the first to sign, in Belfast City Hall, Ulster's Solemn League and Covenant. This bound signatories "to stand by one another in defending for ourselves and our children our position of equal citizenship in the United Kingdom, and in using all means which may be found necessary to defeat the present conspiracy to set up a Home Rule Parliament in Ireland".

In January 1913, Carson declared for the exclusion of Ulster and called for the enlistment of up to 100,000 Covenanters as drilled and armed Ulster Volunteers. On 23 September, the second Ulster Day, he accepted Chairmanship of a Provisional Government organised by Craig.  If Home Rule were imposed "we will be governed as a conquered community and nothing else". By July 1914, the Ulster Covenant had been complemented by a British Covenant organised by Alfred Milner through the Union Defence League. Nearly two million signatories declared themselves willing to "supporting any action that may be effective" to prevent the people of Ulster being deprived "of their rights as citizens of the United Kingdom".

Partition

On 4 August 1914, the United Kingdom declared war on Germany. A few weeks later the Home Rule bill received Royal Assent but with implementation suspended for the duration of European hostilities. With the issue of Ulster's exclusion unresolved, leaders on both sides sought favour with the Government and the British public by committing themselves, and their volunteers, to the war effort.

The strategy was challenged on the nationalist side. As the militants saw it, contingents of republican Irish Volunteers and Connolly's Citizen Army ensured that while Irishmen, at Redmond's urging, were sacrificing themselves for the sake of Belgium, Britain could be seen on the streets of Dublin in Easter 1916 suppressing an Irish strike for freedom. In the aftermath of the Rising and in the course of a national campaign against military conscription, the IPP's credibility was exhausted.

In the Coupon Election of December 1918, the first Westminster poll since 1910 and the first with all adult males, and women from age thirty, eligible to vote (the electorate tripled), the IPP was almost wholly replaced in nationalist constituencies by Sinn Féin. Acting on their mandate, Sinn Féin MPs met in Dublin in January 1919 as the Dáil Éireann, the national assembly, of the Republic declared in 1916 and demanded that the "English garrison" evacuate. In the six north-east counties, Unionists took 22 out of 29 seats.

Violence against Catholics in Belfast, driven out of workplaces and attacked in their districts, and a boycott of Belfast goods, accompanied by looting and destruction, in the South, helped consolidate "real partition, spiritual and voluntary" in advance of the constitutional partition. This otherwise uncompromising Republicans regarded as, at least for now, inevitable. In August 1920 Éamon de Valera, President of Dáil, declared in favour of "giving each county power to vote itself out of the Republic if it so wished".

In the hope of brokering a compromise that might yet hold Ireland within Westminster's jurisdiction, the Government proceeded with the Government of Ireland Act 1920. This provided for two subordinate parliaments. In Belfast a Northern Ireland parliament would convene for the six rather than nine Ulster counties (in three, Craig conceded, Sinn Féiners would make government "absolutely impossible for us"). The island's remaining twenty-six counties, Southern Ireland, would be represented in Dublin. In a joint Council, the two parliaments would be free to enter into all-Ireland arrangements.

In 1921, elections for these parliaments were duly held. But in Southern Ireland this was for parliament which, by British agreement, would now constitute itself as the Dáil Éireann of the Irish Free State. Under the terms of the Anglo-Irish Treaty, the twenty-six counties were to have the "same constitutional status in the Community of Nations known as the British Empire as the Dominion of Canada". It was not clear to all parties at the time—civil war ensued—but this was de facto independence.

Unionists in Northern Ireland thus found themselves in the unanticipated position of having to work a constitutional arrangement that was the by-product of an attempt by British statesmen to reconcile the determination of the Protestant population of the North to remain without qualification within the United Kingdom with the aspirations of the Nationalist majority in Ireland for Irish unity and independence.

Writing to Prime Minister David Lloyd George, Craig did insist that it was only as a sacrifice in the interest of peace that the North had accepted a home-rule arrangement its representatives had not asked for. No regret, however, was evident when addressing Belfast shipyard workers. Once Unionists had their own parliament, Craig assured the workers, "no power on earth would ever be able to touch them".

In debating the Government of Ireland Bill, Craig had conceded that, while unionists did not want a separate parliament, having in the six counties "all the paraphernalia of Government" might make it more difficult for future Liberal and/or Labour government to push Northern Ireland against the will of its majority into all-Ireland arrangements This was to become the prevailing attitude, summed up in a 1936 report of the Ulster Unionist Council: "Northern Ireland without a Parliament of her own would be a standing temptation to certain British Politicians to make another bid for a final settlement with the Irish Republic".

Unionist majority rule: Northern Ireland 1921–1972

Exclusion from Westminster Politics

Unionists have emphasised that their victory in the Home Rule struggle was partial. It was not only that twenty-six of thirty-two Irish counties were lost to the Union, but that within the six retained unionists were "unable to make the British government in London fully acknowledge their full and unequivocal membership of the United Kingdom".

Although technically constituted by the decision of the six-county Parliament elected in 1920 to opt out of Irish Free State, the Government of Northern Ireland had some of the formal features of the Canada-style dominion status accorded to the new state in the South. Like Ottawa, Belfast had a two-chamber Parliament, a Cabinet and Prime Minister (Sir James Craig), and the Crown represented by a Governor and advised by a Privy Council. All this was suggestive, not of a devolved administration within the United Kingdom, but of a state constituted under the Crown outside the direct jurisdiction of the Westminster parliament.

The impression that Ireland as a whole was being removed from Westminster politics was reinforced by refusal of the parties of Government and Opposition to organise, or canvass for votes, in the six counties.  The Conservatives were content that Ulster Unionist Party MPs took their party whip in the House of Commons where, by general agreement, matters within the competence of the Belfast Parliament could not be raised. The Labour Party formed its first (minority) government in 1924 led by a man who in 1905 had been the election agent in North Belfast for the trade-unionist William Walker, Ramsey MacDonald. In 1907 MacDonald's party had held their first party conference in Belfast. Yet, at the height of the Home Rule Crisis in 1913, the British Labour Party had decided not stand against Irish Labour, and the policy of deferring to Irish parties was maintained after 1921.

There was little incentive for unionists in Northern Ireland to assume the risks of splitting ranks in order to reproduce the dynamic of Westminster politics. Despite its broad legislative powers, the Belfast Parliament did not, in any case, have the kinds of tax and spending powers that might have engendered that kind of party competition. The principal sources of government revenue, income and corporation taxes, customs and excise, were entirely beyond Belfast's control.

Stormont government

Until the crisis of the late 1960s, unionism in Northern Ireland was effectively single-party politics. In his 28 years in Stormont (1925–1953) Tommy Henderson, a North Belfast independent, was a one-man unionist opposition. In the 1938 the Ulster Progressive Unionist Party of William John Stewart attempted to join him, averaging 30% of the vote in ten otherwise safe Government seats. After positively endorsing the Union, in 1953 the Northern Ireland Labour Party won three seats. But for the most part Government candidates were returned by unionist voters without contest. The Nationalist Party did not take their seats during the first Stormont parliament (1921–25), and did not accept the role of official Opposition for a further forty years.

Proclaimed by Craig a "Protestant parliament", and with a "substantial and assured" Unionist-Party majority the Stormont legislature could not, in any case, play a significant role. Real power "lay with the regional government itself and its administration": a structure "run by a very small number of individuals". Between 1921 and 1939 only twelve people served in cabinet, some continuously. It was in protest that the Progressive Unionists had proposed limited office in government to 8 years or two parliaments.

Although they had no positive political programme for a devolved parliament, the Unionist regime did attempt an early reform. Consistent with the obligation under the Government of Ireland Act to neither establish nor endow a religion, a 1923 Education Act provided that in schools religious instruction would only be permitted after school hours and with parental consent. Lord Londonderry, Minister of Education, acknowledged that his ambition was mixed Protestant-Catholic education. A coalition of Protestant clerics, school principals and Orangemen insisted on the imperative of bible teaching. Craig relented, amending the act in 1925. Meanwhile, the Catholic hierarchy refused to transfer any schools, and would not allow male Catholic student teachers to enrol in a common training college with Protestants or women. The school-age segregation of Protestants and Catholics was sustained.

At the end of World War II, the Unionist Government under Basil Brooke (Lord Brookeborough) did make two reform commitments. First, it promised a programme of "slum clearance" and public housing construction (in the wake of the Belfast Blitz the authorities acknowledged that much of the housing stock had been "uninhabitable" before the war). Second, the Government accepted an offer from London—understood as a reward for the province's wartime service—to match the parity in taxation between Northern Ireland and Great Britain with parity in the services delivered. What Northern Ireland might loose in autonomy, it was going to gain in a closer, more equal, Union.

By the 1960s Unionism was administering something at odds with the general conservatism of those to whom leadership had been conceded in the resistance to Irish Home Rule. Under the impetus of the post-War Labour government in Britain, and thanks to the generosity of British exchequer, Northern Ireland had emerged with an advanced welfare state. The Education Act (NI), 1947, "revolutionised access" to secondary and further education.  Health-care provision was expanded and re-organised on the model of the National Health Service in Great Britain to ensure universal access. The Victorian-era Poor Law, sustained after 1921, was replaced with a comprehensive system of social-security. Under the Housing Act (NI) 1945 the public subvention for new home construction was even greater, proportionately, than in England and Wales.

1960s: reform and protest
In the 1960s, under premiership of Terence O'Neill, the Stormont administration intensified its efforts to attract outside capital. Investment in new infrastructure, training schemes coordinated with trade unions, and direct grants succeeded in attracting American, British and continental firms. In its own terms, the strategy was a success. While the great Victorian industries continued to decline, the level of manufacturing employment marginally increased. Yet Protestant workers and local Unionist leadership were unsettled. Unlike the established family firms and skilled-trades apprenticeships that had been "a backbone of unionism and protestant privilege", the new companies readily employed Catholics and women. But among Catholics too there was concern over the regional distribution of the new investment.

When Derry lost out to Coleraine for siting of the New University of Ulster, and to Lurgan and Portadown for a new urban-industrial development, some sensed a wider conspiracy. Speaking to Labour MPs in London, John Hume suggested that "the plan" was "to develop the strongly Unionist-Belfast-Coleraine-Portadown triangle and to cause a migration from West to East Ulster, redistributing and scattering the minority to that the Unionist Party will not only maintain but strengthen its position".

Hume, a teacher from Derry, presented himself as a spokesman for an emerging "third force": a "generation of younger Catholics in the North" who were frustrated with the nationalist policy of non-recognition and abstention. (O'Neill wrote of "a new  Catholic intelligentsia", the product, he imagined, of the 1947 Education Act, "unwilling to put up with the deprived status their fathers and grandfathers had taken for granted")  Determined to engage the great social problems of housing, unemployment and emigration, they were willing to accept "the Protestant tradition in the North as legitimate" and that Irish unity should be achieved only "by the will of the Northern majority". Although they appeared to meet Unionists half way, Hume and those who joined him in what he proposed would be "the emergence of normal politics" presented the Unionism with a new challenge. Drawing on the civil rights movements in the United States, they spoke a language of universal rights which had a broad appeal for British and international opinion.

Since 1964, the Campaign for Social Justice had been collating and publicising evidence of discrimination in employment and housing. From April 1967 the cause was taken up by the Belfast-based Northern Ireland Civil Rights Association, a broad labour and republican grouping with Communist Party veteran Betty Sinclair as chair. Seeking to "challenge . . . by more vigorous action than Parliamentary questions and newspaper controversy", NICRA decided to carry out a programme of marches.

In October 1968 Derry Housing Action Committee proposed a march in Derry. When a sectarian confrontation threatened—the Apprentice Boys of Derry announced their intention to march the same route—the NICRA executive was in favour of calling it off. But DHAC pressed ahead with activist Eamon McCann conceding that the "conscious, if unspoken strategy, was to provoke the police into overreaction and thus spark off mass reaction against the authorities". A later official inquiry suggests that, in the event (and as witnessed by three Westminster Labour MPs), all that had been required for police to begin "using their batons indiscriminately" was defiance of the initial order to disperse. The day ended with street battles in Derry's Catholic Bogside area. With this, onset of what is referred to as "The Troubles", Northern Ireland, for the first time in decades, was making British and international headlines, and television news.

Opposition to O'Neill

In January 1965, at O'Neill personal invitation, Taoiseach Seán Lemass (whose government was pursuing a similar modernising agenda in the South) made an unheralded visit to Stormont. After O'Neill reciprocated with a visit to Dublin, the Nationalists were persuaded, for the first time, to assume the role at Stormont of Her Majesty's Opposition. With this and other conciliatory gestures (unprecedented visits to a Catholic hospitals and schools, flying the Union flag at half mast for the death of Pope John XXIII) O'Neill incurred the wrath of those he understood as "self-styled 'loyalists' who see moderation as treason, and decency as weakness", among these the Reverend Ian Paisley.

As Moderator of his own Free Presbyterian Church, and at a time when he believed mainline presbyteries were being led down a "Roman road" by the Irish Council of Churches, Paisley saw himself treading in the path of the "greatest son" of Irish Presbyterianism, Dr. Henry Cooke.  Like Cooke, Paisley was alert to ecumenicism "both political and ecclesiastical". After the Lemass meeting, Paisley announced that "the Ecumenists . . . are selling us out", and called on Ulster Protestants to resist a "policy of treachery".

Many within his own party were alarmed when in December 1968 O'Neill sacked his hard-line Minister of Home Affairs, William Craig and proceeded with a reform package that addressed many of NICRA's demands. There was to be a needs-based points system for public housing; an ombudsman to investigate citizen grievances; the abolition of the rates-based franchise in council elections (One man, one vote); and The Londonderry Corporation (through which Unionists had administered a predominately nationalist city) was suspended and replaced by Development Commission. The broad security provisions of the Special Powers Act were to be reviewed.

At a Downing Street summit on 4 November, Prime Minister Harold Wilson warned O'Neill that if Stormont backtracked on reform, the British government would reconsider its financial support for Northern Ireland. In a television address, O'Neill cautioned Unionists that they could not choose to be part of the United Kingdom merely when it "suits" them, and that "defiance" of the British government would be reckless. Jobs in the shipyards and other major industries, subsidies for farmers, people's pensions: "all these aspects of our life, and many others depend on support from Britain. Is a freedom to pursue the un-Christian path of communal strife and sectarian bitterness really more important to you than all the benefits of the British Welfare state?"

With members of his cabinet urging him to call Wilson's "bluff", and facing a Backbencher motion of no-confidence, in January 1969 O'Neill called a general election. The Ulster Unionist Party split. Pro-O'Neill candidates picked up Liberal and Labour votes but won only a plurality of seats. In his own constituency of Bannside, from which he had previously been returned unopposed, the Prime Minister was humiliated by achieving only a narrow victory over Paisley standing as a Protestant Unionist. On 28 April 1969, O'Neill resigned.

O'Neill's position had been weakened when, focused on demands not conceded (redrawing of electoral boundaries, immediate repeal of the Special Power Act and disbandment of the Special Constabulary), republicans and left-wing students disregarded appeals from within NICRA and Hume's Derry Citizens Action Committee to suspend protest. On 4 January 1969 People's Democracy marchers en route from Belfast to Derry were ambushed and beaten by loyalists, including off-duty Specials, at Burntollet Bridge That night, there was renewed street fighting in the Bogside.  From behind barricades, residents declared "Free Derry", briefly Northern Ireland's first security-force "no-go area".

Tensions had been further heightened in the days before O'Neill's resignation when a number of explosions at electricity and water installations were attributed to the IRA. The later Scarman Tribunal established that the "outrages" were "the work of Protestant extremists . . . anxious to undermine confidence" in O'Neill's leadership. (The bombers, styling themselves "the Ulster Volunteer Force", had announced their presence in 1966 with a series of sectarian killings). The IRA did go into action on the night of 20/21 April, bombing ten post offices in Belfast in an attempt to draw the RUC away from Derry where there was again serious violence.

Imposition of direct rule

To the extent they acknowledge inequities in Unionist rule from Stormont—Paisley was later to allow "it wasn't . . a fair government. It wasn't justice for all"—unionists argue these were a result of insecurity which successive British governments had themselves created by their own divided view on Northern Ireland's place in the United Kingdom.  When the tensions to which it had contributed to in Northern Ireland finally exploded, unionists believe British equivocation proved disastrous. Had they regarded Northern Ireland is an integral part of the United Kingdom, the Government's response in 1969–69 would have been "fundamentally different". If they had thought there were social and political grievances which were remediable by law, it would have been the business of Westminster to legislate. But acts of rebellion would have been suppressed and punished as such with the full authority and force of the state. At no point, according to this unionist analysis, would the policy have been one of containment and negotiation.

The example of Free Derry was replicated in other nationalist neighbourhoods both in Derry and in Belfast. Sealed off with barricades, the areas were openly policed by the IRA. In what was reported as the biggest British military operation since the Suez Crisis, Operation Motorman, on 31 July 1972, the British Army did eventually act to re-establish control. But this had been preceded in the weeks before by a ceasefire in the course of which Provisional IRA leaders, including Chief of Staff Seán Mac Stíofáin and his lieutenants Martin McGuinness and Gerry Adams, were flown to London for what proved to be unsuccessful negotiations with Northern Ireland Secretary William Whitelaw, acting on behalf of the UK Prime Minister, Edward Heath.  

The common unionist charge was that Westminster and Whitehall continued to classify Northern Ireland, as it had Ireland before partition, as "something more akin to a colonial than a domestic problem". From the first street deployment of troops in 1969 the impression given was of "a peace-keeping operation in which Her Majesty's Forces are not defending their homeland, but holding at bay two sects and factions as in Imperial India, Mandated Palestine or in Cyprus". This played into the republican narrative that "the insurgence in the housing estates and borderland of Ulster" was something akin to the Third World wars of liberation, and that in Britain's first and last colony "decolonisation will be forced upon her as it was in Aden and elsewhere".

With London, Unionist credibility on security did not survive internment, introduced at the insistence of Stormont government under Brian Faulkner. In the early hours of 10 August 1971 342 persons suspected of IRA involvement were arrested without charge or warrant. Many appeared to have no connection with the IRA, and for those that did the link typically was to the left-leaning Officials. Beyond immediate defence of Catholics areas, the Officials had already committed to unarmed political strategy—and on that basis were to declare a ceasefire in May 1972. Leading Provisionals, some of whom were new to the IRA, entirely escaped the net. Unionists blamed the poor intelligence on London's decision to tolerate no-go areas.

For the British Government internment proved a public relations disaster, both domestic and international. It was compounded by the interrogation of internees by methods (the so-called the five techniques) that were eventually deemed illegal by the UK Government's own commission of inquiry (and subsequently, in a case brought by the Irish government, ruled "inhuman and degrading" by the European Court of Human Rights). Further national and international outrage followed the Army's lethal use of live fire against unarmed anti-internment protesters, Bloody Sunday in Derry (20 January 1972) being the most notorious incident.

In March, Heath demanded that Faulkner surrender control of internal security. When, as might have been anticipated, Faulkner resigned rather than comply, Heath in an instant shattered, for unionists, "the theory that the Army was simply in Northern Ireland for the purpose of offering aid to the civil power, of defending legally established institutions against terrorist attack". In what unionists viewed as a victory for violence, the Conservative government prorogued Stormont and imposed direct rule "not merely to restore order but to reshape the Province's system of government".

Negotiating the Irish Dimension: 1973–2006

Sunningdale Agreement and the Ulster Workers strike

In October 1972 the British government brought out a Green Paper, The Future of Northern Ireland. It articulated what were to be the enduring principles of the British approach to a settlement. It is a fact that an element of the minority in Northern Ireland has hitherto seen itself as simply part of the wider Irish community. The problem of accommodating that minority within the political of Northern Ireland has to some extent been an aspect of a wider problem within Ireland as a whole.

It is therefore clearly desirable that any new arrangements for Northern Ireland should, whilst meeting the wishes of Northern Ireland and Great Britain, be so far as possible acceptable to accepted by the Republic of Ireland.

Northern Ireland must and will remain part of the United Kingdom for as long as that is the wish of a majority of the people, but that status does not preclude the necessary taking into account of what has been described in this paper as the 'Irish Dimension.'

A Northern Ireland assembly or authority must be capable of involving all its members constructively in way which satisfy them and those they represent that the whole community has a part to pay in the government of the Province. ... [T]here are strong arguments that the objective of real participation should be achieved by giving minority interests a share in the exercise of executive power .

In June 1973 PR elections were held for an Assembly. Following negotiations at Sunningdale in England, attended by the Dublin government, on 1 January 1974 the former Unionist prime minister Brian Faulkner agreed to form an Executive in coalition with Hume's new Social Democratic and Labour Party (SDLP) and the smaller cross-community Alliance Party. Faulkner's later successor as party leader, James Molyneaux, argued that the difficulty for most unionists was not an arrangement in which Protestants and Catholics must consent. It was that, despite a promise not share power with parties whose primary aim is a united Ireland, Faulkner had committed them to agreement with "Republican Catholics"

Having drawn on both the Republican and Northern Ireland, Labour parties, the SDLP had sought to accommodate "progressive Protestants". But with PIRA continuing to draw on public outrage over internment and Bloody Sunday, the SDLP was under pressure to present Sunningdale as a means to achieving the goal of Irish unity. The new Health and Social Service Minister, Paddy Devlin, conceded that "all other issues were governed" by a drive to "get all-Ireland institutions established" that would "produce the dynamic that would lead ultimately to an agreed united Ireland".

The Sunningdale Agreement envisaged a Council of Ireland comprising, with equal delegations from Dublin and Belfast, a Council of Ministers with "executive and harmonising functions" and a Consultative Assembly with advisory and review functions. Unionists feared these created the possibility of their being manoeuvred into a minority position. In retrospect, Devlin regretted the SDLP had not "adopted a two stage approach, by allowing power sharing at Stormont to establish itself", but by the time he and his colleagues recognised the damage they had caused to Faulkner's position by prioritising the Irish Dimension it was too late.

Within a week of taking office as First Minister, Faulkner was forced to resign as UUP leader. A surprise Westminster election at the end of February was a triumph for the United Ulster Unionist Coalition, in which the bulk of his old party stood as Official Unionists with William Craig's Ulster Vanguard and Paisley's new Democratic Unionists. Faulkner's pro-Assembly grouping was left with just 13% of the unionist vote. Arguing that they had deprived Faulkner of any semblance of a mandate, the victors called for new Assembly elections.

When in May the Assembly affirmed the Sunningdale Agreement, a loyalist coalition, the Ulster Workers' Council (UWC), called a general strike. Within two weeks the UWC, supported by the Ulster Defence Association and UVF paramilitaries, had an effective stranglehold on energy supplies. Concessions sought by Faulkner were blocked by the SDLP. John Hume, then Minister of Commerce, pressed for a British Army enforced fuel-oil plan and for resistance to "a fascist takeover". After Mervyn Rees, the Northern Ireland Secretary refused his final plea for negotiation, Faulkner resigned. Conceding that there was no longer any constitutional basis for the Executive, Rees dissolved the Assembly.

Unionism and loyalist para-militarism

In inaugurating a prolonged period of Direct Rule, the UWC strike weakened the representative role of the unionist parties. There were to be a number of consultative assemblies and forums in the years that followed, but the only elective offices with administrative responsibilities were in downsized district councils. At Westminster unionist MPs contended with governments that remained committed to the principles of the 1972 Green Paper. The initiative in protesting what unionists often perceived as inadequate political and security responses to republican violence passed to loyalists.

The loyalists principal mode of operation was not to be the work stoppage. With Paisley's blessing, in 1977 the UDA and a number of other loyalists groups sought to replicate the UWC success. Stoppages in support of a  "unionist wish-list"—essentially a return to Stormont-era majority rule—failed to secure the support of critical workers and broke up in face UUP condemnation and firm police action. Nor was it to be the ballot, although both the UVF and the UDA did establish party-political wings. It was assassination: in the course of the Troubles loyalists are credited with the murder of 1027 individuals (about half the number attributed to republican paramilitaries and 30% of the total killed).

Loyalism, of which the once largely rural Orange Order had been the archetypal expression, is generally understood as a strand of unionism. It has been characterised as partisan but not necessarily party-political, and in outlook as more ethnic than consciously British—the perspective of those who are Ulster Protestants first and British second. Loyalism can embrace evangelicals, but the term is consistently associated with the paramilitaries and, on that basis, frequently used as if it were synonymous with working-class unionism. The paramilitaries are "thoroughly working class". Their hold, typically, has been upon working-class Protestant neighbourhoods and housing estates where they have compensated for the loss of the confidence they enjoyed as district defenders in early years of the Troubles with racketeering and intimidation.

Paisley combined his radically anti-Catholic evangelism early in his career with a foray into physical force loyalism: his formation in 1956 of Ulster Protestant Action (UPA). Ulster Protestant Volunteers implicated Paisley, albeit via supposed intermediaries, in the bombings intended to "blow O'Neill out of office" early in 1969. Leaders of the UVF, however, are adamant that Paisley had nothing to do with them. His rhetoric may have been inspirational, but theirs was a tightly guarded conspiracy. The motivation to kill came largely from secular forces within the Loyalist community. Through the DUP, Paisley ultimately was to lead the bulk of his following into party politics, emerging in the new century as unionism's undisputed leader.

The relationship of other, at the time, more mainstream, unionist political figures to loyalist paramilitaries is also a subject of debate. Paramilitaries deny and resent any implication of political string pulling, They suggest, nonetheless, that they could rely on the politicians to deliver their message. The party leaders might condemn loyalist outrages, but inasmuch as they tried to account for them as reactive, as a response to the injury and frustration of the unionist people, they were effectively employing sectarian, frequently random, killings for a common purpose, to extract concessions from the Government: "You know, 'if you don't talk to us, you will have to talk to these armed men". The relationship of unionists to loyalist violence, in this sense, remained "ambiguous".

Opposition to the 1985 Anglo-Irish Agreement

In 1985 Prime Minister Margaret Thatcher signed an agreement at Hillsborough with the Irish Taoiseach, Garret FitzGerald. For the first time this appeared to give the Republic a direct role in the government of Northern Ireland. An Anglo-Irish Intergovernmental Conference, with a locally based secretariat, would invite the Irish government to "put forward views on proposals" for major legislation concerning Northern Ireland. Proposals, however, would only be on matters that are "not the responsibility of a devolved administration in Northern Ireland". The implication for unionists was that if they wished to limit Dublin's influence, they would have to climb down from insistence on majority rule and think again as to how nationalists might be accommodated at Stormont.

The unionist reaction, Thatcher recalled in her memoirs, was "worse than anyone had predicted to me". The Ulster Unionist Party (UUP) and Democratic Unionist Party (DUP) led an "Ulster says No" campaign against the Anglo-Irish or Hillsborough Agreement, that included strikes, civil disobedience and a mass resignation of unionist MPs from Westminster and suspensions of district council meetings. In the largest unionist protest since Ulster Day 1912, on 23 November 1985 upwards of a hundred thousand rallied outside Belfast City Hall. "Where do the terrorists return to for sanctuary?" Paisley asked the crowd: "To the Irish Republic and yet Mrs. Thatcher tells us the Republic may have some say in our province. We say, Never! Never! Never! Never!".

Unionists, however, found themselves isolated, opposing a Conservative government and with a Westminster Opposition, Labour, that was sympathetic to Irish unity. With no obvious political leverage, and possibly to prevent initiative passing to the loyalist paramilitaries, in November 1986 Paisley announced his own "third force": The Ulster Resistance Movement (URM) would "take direct action as and when required". Recruitment rallies were held in towns across Northern Ireland and thousands were said to have joined. Despite importing arms, some of which were passed on to the UVF and UDA, for the URM the call for action never came. By the fourth anniversary of the accord, unionist protests against the Anglo-Irish Agreement were drawing only token support.

In March 1991, the two unionist parties agreed with the SDLP and Alliance arrangements for political talks on the future of Northern Ireland. In their submission to the inter-party talks in 1992, the Ulster Unionists said they could envisage a range of cross-border bodies so long as these were under the control of the Northern Assembly, did not involve an overarching all-Ireland Council, and were not designed to be developed in the direction of joint authority. While prepared to accommodate an Irish Dimension unionists, at a minimum, were looking for a settlement not an "unsettlement".

UK-party unionism
As an alternative to devolution with an Irish Dimension, some unionists proposed that Northern Ireland reject special status within the United Kingdom, and return to what they conceived as the original unionist programme of complete legislative and political union. This had been the position of the British and Irish Communist Organisation (B&ICO), a small contrarian left-wing grouping that had come to the attention of unionists through their Two-nations Theory of partition and their critical support for the UWC Strike.

The British Labour Party, they argued, had been persuaded that Irish unity was the only left option in Northern Ireland less on its merits than on the superficial appearance of unionism as the six-county Tory Party. Had Labour tested the coalition that was unionism as it began fracture in the late 1960s by itself canvassing for voters in Northern Ireland, the party might have proved the "bridge between Catholics and the state". Disappointed in Labour's response and contending with a unionist split (Democracy Now) led by the only Northern Irish Labour MP (sitting for a London constituency) Kate Hoey, the B&ICO dissolved its Campaign for Labour Representation in 1993. A broader Campaign for Equal Citizenship, in which for a period the B&ICO also participated, to draw all three Westminster parties to Northern Ireland similarly failed to convince. Its president, Robert McCartney did briefly hold together five anti-devolution UK Unionist Party MLAs in the 1998 Assembly.

The 2003 Labour Party Conference accepted legal advice that the party could not continue to exclude Northern Ireland residents from party membership. The National Executive Committee, however, maintains a ban on the Labour Party in Northern Ireland contesting elections. Support for the SDLP continues to be party policy.

In July 2008, under Reg Empey Ulster Unionists sought to restore the historic link to the Conservative Party, broken in the wake of Sunningdale. With the new Conservative leader David Cameron declaring that "the semi-detached status of Northern Ireland politics needs to end", Empey announced that his party would be running candidates in upcoming Westminster elections as Ulster Conservatives and Unionists – New Force. The move triggered defections, and in 2010 election the party lost their only remaining MP, Sylvia Hermon who campaigned successfully as an independent. The episode confirmed the UUP's eclipse by the Democratic Unionists, a party that mixed social and economic populism with their uncompromising unionism.

Northern Ireland Conservatives have since contested elections on their own. Their 4 candidates in the 2019 Westminster election polled a total 5,433 votes.

1998 Good Friday Agreement

SDLP leader Seamus Mallon quipped that the 1998 Belfast, or Good Friday, Agreement (GFA) was "Sunningdale for slow learners". This was not the view of David Trimble, with whom Mallon, as joint head of the new power-sharing Executive, shared the Office of First Minister and Deputy First Minister (OFMDFM). Trimble believed that unionism had secured much that had been denied to Faulkner 25 years before.

The Council of Ireland, that Mallon's party colleague, Hugh Logue, had referred to as "the vehicle that would trundle Unionists into a united Ireland" was replaced by a North-South Ministerial Council. "Not a supra-national body", and with no "pre-cooked" agenda, the Council was accountable to the Assembly where procedural rules (the Petition of Concern) allowed for cross-community consent, and hence a "unionist veto".

For the first time, Dublin formally recognised the border as the limit of its jurisdiction. The Republic amended its Constitution to omit the territorial claim to the whole island of Ireland and to acknowledge that Irish unity could be achieved only by majority consent "democratically expressed, in both jurisdictions in the island". The firm nationalist principle that unionists are a minority within the territory of the state was set aside.

In return, however, unionists had to accept that within new framework for power-sharing there could be no escaping the need to secure republican consent. The new Executive would be formed not, as in 1974, by voluntary coalition but by the allocation ministerial posts to the Assembly parties on a proportional basis. This d'Hondt method ensured that unionists would find themselves sitting at the Executive table with those they had persistently labelled IRA-Sinn Féin. In 1998 Sinn Féin, who had been gaining on the SDLP since the eighties, had 18 Assembly seats (to 26 for the SDLP) securing them two of the ten Executive departments.

Unionists were concerned that this sharing of office was based on a principle that "rendered dangerously incoherent" the UK government's position in relation to the Union. The Agreement insists on a symmetry between unionism and nationalism, the two "designations" it privileges over "others" through the procedural rules of the new Assembly. Either can insist (through a Petition of Concern) on decision by parallel consent, and they nominate the First and Deputy First Ministers which, despite the distinction in title, are a joint office. "Parity of esteem" is accorded to two diametrically opposed aspirations: one to support and uphold the state, the other to renounce and subvert the state in favour of another. The UK government may have deflected the republican demand that it be a persuader for Irish unity, but at the cost, in the unionist view, of maintaining neutrality with regard to future of Northern Ireland.

In the UK's acceptance of Irish unity by consent was not new. It had been there in 1973 at Sunningdale, in the Anglo-Irish Agreement of 1985 and again in the 1993 Downing Street Declaration in which London had disclaimed any "selfish strategic or economic interest" in the matter. Unionists were nonetheless discomforted by the republican claim that the 1998 Agreement had, in the words of Gerry Adams, "dealt the union a severe blow": "there was now no absolute commitment, no raft of parliamentary acts to back up an absolute claim, only an agreement to stay until the majority decided otherwise".

In the May 1998 referendum on the Good Friday Agreement, on a turnout of 81%, 71.1% voted in favour. (A simultaneous referendum held in the Republic of Ireland on a 56% turnout produced a majority in favour of 94.4%). The best estimates indicated that all but 3 or 4% of Catholics/Nationalists voted Yes, but that almost half of Protestants/Unionists (between 47 and 49%) stood with the DUP and voted No.

Chief among the DUP's objections was neither the North-South Ministerial Council, although that remained under suspicion, nor the principle of power-sharing as such. When the new Executive was formed, the DUP matched Sinn Féin in taking two ministerial seats. The issue was the continuation of the IRA as an armed and active organisation: the republicans were at the table while retaining, at readiness, the capacity for terrorist action further bolstered by the release of republican prisoners. In an agreement that called parties to use their influence with paramilitaries to achieve disarmament, there was no effective sanction. Martin McGuinness and Gerry Adams were free to insist that the IRA took their own counsel.

In October 2002, at a time the IRA had finally agreed but not yet complied with a process for decommissioning their arms, a police raid on Sinn Féin's offices at Stormont suggested that the organisation was still active and collecting intelligence. Trimble led the UUP out of the Executive and the Assembly was suspended. (No charges were brought as a result of the raid at the centre of which was a Sinn Féin staffer, Denis Donaldson, later exposed as a government informer, and a public inquiry was ruled not in the public interest).

Democratic Unionists enter government with Sinn Féin
In October 2006 the DUP and Sinn Féin found an accommodation in the St Andrews Agreement, paving the way for Ian Paisley and Martin McGuinness to be nominated as First, and Deputy First, Ministers by a restored Assembly. For the UUP's new leader Reg Empey the breakthrough was merely the GFA "for slow learners". But while he acknowledged compromises, Paisley argued that Northern Ireland was "turning a corner". The IRA had disarmed, and from Sinn Féin support had been won "for all the institutions of policing". Northern Ireland had "come to a time of peace".

After thirteen months in office Paisley was replaced as First Minister of Northern Ireland by his long-time DUP deputy Peter Robinson Robinson, and Arlene Foster who followed him in office from January 2016, had colder relationships than had Paisley with McGuinness and with his party colleagues and these eventually broke down.  Citing "DUP's arrogance" in relation to a range of issues, including management of a financial scandal, in January 2017 McGuinness resigned. Sinn Féin refused to nominate a successor, without whom the devolved institutions were unworkable. Assembly elections followed on 2 March 2017. For the first time in the history of Northern Ireland as a political entity, with 45 of 90 seats unionists failed to secure an overall majority in a parliament of the region.

It was not until January 2020 that a deal was brokered (New Decade, New Approach) to restore Assembly, and to persuade Sinn Féin to nominate their new leader in the North Michelle O'Neill as McGuinness's successor.

The withdrawal of support within the DUP for Paisley's newly conciliatory leadership was not marked by a lasting split over the DUP decision to go into an Executive with Sinn Féin. In the Assembly, Paisley's former lieutenant, Jim Allister has remained a lone Traditional Unionist Voice protesting an "enforced coalition" that "holds at the heart of government" those determined to subvert the state.

Unionism as a minority bloc

Brexit and the Northern Ireland Protocol

Four months before the UK's June 2016 referendum on the future of UK membership in the European Union, Arlene Foster announced that her party had decided, on balance, to campaign for Leave. With equal claim to be a pro-business party with a strong farming support base, the UUP decided that "on balance Northern Ireland is better remaining in the European Union". At a time when Sinn Féin was citing the cross-border, all-island, economic activity facilitated and supported by the EU as a further argument for Irish unity, there was a sense that, among other benefits, Brexit would restore a measure of "distance" from Dublin.

By a margin of 12% Northern Ireland voted Remain (with Scotland, the only UK region to do so outside London). The DUP position remained that Leave had been a UK-wide decision. Yet as Brexit negotiations with the EU 27 proceeded Foster felt the need to insist that a UK-wide mandate to leave could be honoured only by the UK "leaving the European Union as a whole", its "territorial and economic integrity" intact.

The DUP's ten MPs enabled Theresa May's Conservative Government to remain in power; following the hung parliament that resulted from the snap general election in 2017.  However, divisions within May's Conservative Party limited DUP influence on Brexit policy. Legislation on withdrawal from EU would require a very much broader cross-party coalition. At the end of the year, May returned from Brussels with a proposal that Northern Ireland, alone, continue with the Republic of Ireland under a common EU's trade regime.

Coalescing behind the Dublin government, the EU 27 had ruled that the interests of the Northern Ireland peace process are "paramount". To avoid the "step backwards" that would be represented, "symbolically and psychologically", by a "hardening" of the Irish border, Northern Ireland should remain in regulatory alignment with the European Single Market and behind the Customs Union frontier. That would allow necessary physical checks on goods to be removed to air and sea points of entry.

Foster protested that the hazards of a no-deal Brexit would be better than this "annexation of Northern Ireland away from the rest of the United Kingdom". She was supported by prominent Brexiteers. Boris Johnson told the 2018 DUP conference that the EU had made Northern Ireland "their indispensable bargaining chip": "if we wanted to do free trade deals, if we wanted to cut tariffs or vary our regulation the we would have to leave Northern Ireland behind as a semi-colony of the EU . . . damaging the fabric of the Union with regulatory checks . . . down the Irish Sea". It would be an "historic mistake". Privately, Johnson complained that the attention to Northern Ireland sensitivities was a case of "the tail wagging the dog" Within three months of replacing May in July 2019, he had amended her withdrawal agreement, stripping the Irish Backstop not of its essential provisions—Northern Ireland would remain a customs point of entry for the EU—but rather of the suggestion that, to avoid singling Northern Ireland out, the UK as a whole might accept an interim regulatory and customs partnership.

The DUP acknowledged the sense of "betrayal". Johnson's Northern Ireland Protocol was "the worst of all worlds". Citing free-trade provisions of the Act of Union, past and present unionist leaders pressed for a judicial review. When eventually rendered in June 2021, the ruling of the Belfast High Court was that while there indeed was a conflict with the Act, in approving the implicitly amending Protocol Parliament was sovereign.

With the Prime Minister secure in his "Get-Brexit-Done" mandate from the 2019 UK general election, the DUP's last line of defence was themselves to appeal to the international and constitutional status of the Good Friday Agreement. Johnson had made one apparent concession: every four years the Northern Ireland Assembly would be called upon to renew the region's new double-border trade arrangements. However, this was to be by simple majority vote. The decision could not be subject to a Petition of Concern, and thus to the prospect of a unionist veto.  For the DUP this was a violation of the Good Friday Agreement under which any proposal to "diminish the powers of the NI assembly" or to "treat NI differently to the rest of UK" had to be on the basis of parallel unionist-nationalist majorities. Citing " the total disregard of this principle", in February 2022 the new DUP leader, Jeffrey Donaldson, withdrew Paul Givan as First Minister, and precipitated a new Assembly election.

The appeal to the cross-community consent provisions of the Good Friday Agreement suggested that unionists now saw themselves, not in Ireland alone but in Northern Ireland, as a minority, deserving of minority protection. The novel predicament had been underscored by the 2019 Westminster election. Although the combined nationalist vote actually fell 3%, Northern Ireland for the first time returned more nationalist MPs than unionist.

Unionist demographics

Asked to account for the 2019 loss to Sinn Féin's John Finucane of North Belfast, a seat her deputy Nigel Dodds had held for nineteen years and which never previously returned a nationalist MP, Arlene Foster replied "The demography just wasn't there. We worked very hard to get the vote out... but the demography was against us". A Sinn Féin election flyer used in the previous 2015 run against Dodds advertised the changed ratio of Catholics to Protestants in the constituency (46.94 per cent to 45.67 per cent). It had a simple message for Catholic voters, "Make the change".

Demography, in this sense, has been a long term concern for unionists. The proportion of people across Northern Ireland identifying as Protestant, or raised Protestant, has fallen from 60% in the 1960s to 48%, while those raised Catholic has increased from 35 to 45%. Only two of the six counties, Antrim and Down, now have "significant Protestant majorities", and only one – Lisburn – of its five official cities. A majority Protestant Northern Ireland "is now restricted to the suburban area surrounding Belfast".  Unionist representation has declined. The combined unionist vote, trailing below 50% in elections since 2014, fell to a new low of just 42.3% in the 2019 Westminster poll.

Unionism losing, however, has not necessarily meant nationalism winning: overall there has been "no comparable increase in the nationalist vote mirroring the decline in the unionist bloc". Despite symbolic triumphs over unionism—returning the larger number of Westminster MPs in 2019, and Sinn Féin as the largest party to Stormont in 2022—at 38% the combined nationalist vote remains below the 41.8% secured in 2005.

Surveys suggest that more people than ever in Northern Ireland, 50%, say they are neither unionist nor nationalist. The electoral impact of eschewing "tribal labels" (upwards of 17% also refuse a religious designation) is limited since those who do so are younger and less likely to turnout in Northern Ireland's still largely polarised elections. It is still the case that few Protestants vote for nationalists, and few Catholics for unionists. But they will vote for others, for parties that decline to make an issue of Northern Ireland's constitutional status.

The principal other party has been the Alliance Party of Northern Ireland. In 2019, Alliance more than doubled its vote from 7.1% to 18.5% in the Northern-Ireland wide May European elections and from 7.9% to 16.8% in the December Westminster election. Competing in the 2022 Assembly election with the full range of local parties, Alliance secured 13.5% of first-preference votes and, with vote transfers, close to a fifth of Assembly seats.

According to exit polling in the 2019 Westminster election, the Alliance surge drew both on past unionist and on past nationalist voters. In the Westminster election, 18% of Alliance's new backers said they voted DUP at the previous contest and 3% for the UUP. 12% had voted for Sinn Féin, and 5% for the-SDLP. The party meanwhile gained a quarter of all non-voters from two years earlier. Alliance is neutral on the constitutional issue, but a January 2020 survey indicates that in a border poll, post-Brexit, twice as many of its voters (47%) would opt for Irish unity as for remaining in the United Kingdom (22%).

Since O'Neill, who in the last Stormont parliamentary election personally canvassed Catholic households, there have been calls within unionism for it to break out of its Protestant base. When he was DUP leader, Peter Robinson spoke of not being "prepared to write off over 40 per cent of our population as being out of reach". Surveys had been suggesting that in a border poll between a quarter and a third of Catholics might vote for the Northern Ireland to remain in the UK. While anti-partition sentiment has strengthened post-Brexit, there may be a significant number of Catholics who meet the standard of "functional unionists": voters whose "rejection of the unionist label is more to do with the brand image of unionism than with their constitutional preferences". It remains the case that only one half of one percent of DUP and UUP members identify as Catholics: a handful of individuals.

Defence of "unionist culture"

In disclaiming any "selfish or strategic" British interest, the 1994 Downing Street Declaration, had effectively ruled that "there could no such thing as disloyalty within Northern Ireland". The conflicting ambitions of nationalism and unionism were of "equal validity".

Unionists accused nationalists taking this new "parity of esteem" as a license for a policy of "unrelenting harassment". Trimble spoke of having to reverse an "insidious erosion of the culture and ethnic national identity of the British people of Ulster" systematically pursued by "the Provisional IRA and its fellow travellers"; and Robinson of a  "fightback" against the "unrelenting Sinn Féin campaign to promote Irish culture and target British structures and symbols".

Unionists alleged a "pan-nationalist [SDLP-Sinn Féin] front" was manipulating public order powers to ban, re-route or otherwise regulate time-hallowed Orange marches. For Trimble the flashpoint was the conflict at Drumcree (1995-2001), for Robinson and Arlene Foster it was the similarly drawn-out Ardoyne shopfronts standoff (2013-2016) in north Belfast. A decision of the once firmly unionist Belfast City Council in 2012 to reduce the number of days the Union Flag was flown from City Hall, was also interpreted as a step in a wider "cultural war" against "Britishness", triggering protest.

The greater issue in inter-party talks proved to be language rights.  On Good Friday, 10 April 1998, Prime Minister Tony Blair was surprised by a last minute demand for recognition of a "Scottish dialect spoken in some parts of Northern Ireland" that Unionists regarded their "equivalent to the Irish language". In insisting on parity for Ulster Scots or Ullans, Trimble believed he was taking this "cultural war" onto the nationalists' own ground. Unionists argued that nationalists had "weaponised" the Irish language issue as "a tool" with which to "batter the Protestant people".

The DUP's first Minister of Culture, Arts and Leisure, Nelson McCausland, argued that privileging Irish through a language act would be an exercise in "ethnic territorial marking". His decision, and that of his party colleagues, to resist Sinn Féin's demand for a stand-alone Irish Language Act, in part by insisting on compensating provisions for Ulster Scots, became one of the principal, publicly acknowledged, sticking points in the three years of on and off again negotiations required to restore the power-sharing executive in 2020. Other unionists object. The "positive ethnic, religious or national special pleading" implicit in the parading, flags and language counteroffensive, they argue, risks defining unionist culture as "subaltern and therefore ripe for absorption into Irish culture as a 'cherished' minor tradition".

The 2020 New Decade New Approach agreement promised both the Irish language and Ulster-Scots new Commissioners to "support" and "enhance" their development but did not accord them equal legal status. While the UK government recognised Scots and Ulster Scots as a regional or minority language for the "encouragement" and "facilitation" purposes of Part II of the European Charter for Regional or Minority Languages, for Irish it assumed the more stringent Part III obligations in respect of education, media and administration. Yet New Decade, New Approach did take a step with Ulster Scots that it does not take with Irish speakers: the UK government pledged to "recognise Ulster Scots as a national minority under the Framework Convention for the Protection of National Minorities". This is a second Council of Europe treaty whose provisions were previously applied in Northern Ireland to non-white groups, to Irish Travellers and to the Roma.

Insofar as unionists are persuaded to identity with Ulster Scots and employ it as a marker (as the reference to "the Ulster Scots / Ulster British tradition in Northern Ireland” in New Decade, New Approach might imply) they define themselves, "in effect", as a scheduled ethnicity.

In 2022, over the objections of unionists who in protest against the Northern Ireland Protocol continued to veto a return to devolved power-sharing, the legislation foreseen in New Decade New Approach was enacted by the Parliament of the United Kingdom. The Identity and Language (Northern Ireland) Act received royal assent on December 6th.

Unionist political parties

 Commonwealth Labour Party (1942–1947) 
 Conservative Party (UK), officially the Conservative and Unionist Party (1830–present)
 Democratic Unionist Party (1971–present)
 Irish Conservative Party (1835–1891)
Irish Loyal and Patriotic Union (1885-1891)
 Irish Unionist Alliance (1891–1922)
 Liberal Unionist Party (1886–1912)
 NI21 (2013–2016)
 Northern Ireland Unionist Party (1999–2008)
 Progressive Unionist Party (1978–present)
 Protestant Unionist Party (1966–1971)
 Traditional Unionist Voice (2007–present)
 UK Independence Party (UKIP 1993–present)
 UK Unionist Party (UKUP 1995–2007)
 Ulster Popular Unionist Party (1980–1995)
 Ulster (Loyalist) Democratic Party (1982–2001)
 Ulster Unionist Party (1921–present)
 Unionist Party of Northern Ireland (1974–1981)
 United Unionist Coalition (1998–2012)
 United Ulster Unionist Party (1975–1984)
 Vanguard Unionist Progressive Party (1973–1978)
 Volunteer Political Party (1974–1975)

References

Further reading

 

 
Political history of the United Kingdom
History of Ireland (1801–1923)
History of Northern Ireland
Ireland and the Commonwealth of Nations
Ireland
Politics of Northern Ireland